Charles Edwin Washington (born October 8, 1966) is a former American football defensive back who played six seasons in the National Football League (NFL) with the Indianapolis Colts, Kansas City Chiefs and Atlanta Falcons. He was drafted by the Colts in the seventh round of the 1989 NFL Draft. He played college football at Cameron University and attended H. Grady Spruce High School in Dallas, Texas. Washington was also a member of the Toronto Argonauts of the Canadian Football League.

References

External links
Just Sports Stats

1968 births
Living people
Players of American football from Shreveport, Louisiana
American football defensive backs
Cameron Aggies football players
Indianapolis Colts players
Kansas City Chiefs players
Atlanta Falcons players
American players of Canadian football
Canadian football defensive backs
Toronto Argonauts players